Robert Lull Forward (August 15, 1932 – September 21, 2002) was an American physicist and science fiction writer. His literary work was noted for its scientific credibility and use of ideas developed from his career as an aerospace engineer. He also made important contributions to gravitational wave detection research.

Biography
Forward earned his doctorate from the University of Maryland in 1965, with a thesis entitled Detectors for Dynamic Gravitational Fields, for the development of a bar antenna for the detection of gravitational radiation.

Career and research
He then went to work at the research labs of Hughes Aircraft, where he continued his research on gravity measurement and received 18 patents. He took early retirement in 1987, to focus on his fiction writing and consulting for such clients as NASA and the U.S. Air Force. In 1994, he co-founded the company Tethers Unlimited, Inc. with Robert P. Hoyt, where he served as Chief Scientist and Chairman until 2002.

Much of his research focused on the leading edges of speculative physics but was always grounded in what he believed humans could accomplish. He worked on such projects as space tethers and space fountains, solar sails (including Starwisp), antimatter propulsion, and other spacecraft propulsion technologies, and did further research on more esoteric possibilities such as time travel and negative matter.  He was issued a patent for the statite, and contributed to a concept to drain the Van Allen Belts.

Forward Mass Detector
Forward's extensive work in the field of gravitational wave detection included the invention of the rotating cruciform gravity gradiometer or 'Forward Mass Detector', for Lunar Mascon (mass concentration) measurements. The gravity gradiometer is described in the well-known textbook Gravitation by Misner, Thorne & Wheeler. The principle behind it is quite simple; getting the implementation right is tricky.  Essentially, two beams are crossed over and connected with an axle through their crossing point.  They are held at right angles to each other by springs.  They have heavy masses at the ends of the beams, and the whole assembly spun around the common axle at high speed.  The angle between the beams is measured continuously, and if it varies with a period half that of the rotation period, it means that the detector is experiencing a measurable gravitational field gradient.

Vacuum Fluctuation Battery
In 1984, Forward published his theoretical design for a "Casimir battery", utilizing the electromagnetic Zero-point energy and the attractive force associated. The Casimir force would pull the plates together, if the plates were charged with same polarity and the electrostatic force applied to the plates is adjusted. The Casimir force will pull the plates together increasing the electric field between each plate and producing a voltage. The battery could be "recharged" by increasing the electrostatic force, pushing the plates apart.

Fiction
In addition to more than 200 papers and articles, he published 11 novels. Critics' reviews were mixed, always praising the science concepts and the aliens he created, but often finding the plots thin and the humans shallow.
His treatment of hard-science topics in fictional form is highly reminiscent of the work of Hal Clement.  He described his first novel, Dragon's Egg, as "a textbook on neutron star physics disguised as a novel."  His novel Rocheworld describes a double-planet system with a single shared atmosphere and ocean, and a beam-powered propulsion interstellar space ship to get there. Forward co-authored two Rocheworld novels with his wife, Martha Dodson Forward, and two additional Rocheworld novels with his second daughter, Julie Fuller. Forward also helped Larry Niven calculate the parameters of the Smoke Ring for his novel The Integral Trees. Much of his scientific research in speculative physics serves as inspiration for science fiction, many of his ideas on Zero-point energy, Interstellar travel and propulsion can be found in contemporary and modern scientific fiction.

Personal life
Forward's son, Bob Forward, has led a successful career as a storyboard artist and writer in television animation, including in He-Man and the Masters of the Universe, The Legend of Zelda, and most famously, Beast Wars.  He is also the author of two novels, The Owl and The Owl 2: Scarlet Serenade.

Forward's youngest, Eve Forward, has written two novels: Villains by Necessity and Animist.

Death
In 2001, Forward received a diagnosis of terminal cancer. He died on September 21, 2002.

Publications

Selected scientific works

Dragon's Egg series
 Dragon's Egg (1980)
 Starquake (1985)
Both collected in an omnibus edition Dragon's Egg & Starquake (1994)

Rocheworld series
1. Rocheworld (Baen, 1990) 155,000 words, originally published in these iterations:
 Rocheworld (1981) original manuscript, 150,000 words
 Rocheworld (Analog, 1982) 60,000 words
 The Flight of the Dragonfly (Timescape, 1984) hardcover, ~100,000 words
 The Flight of the Dragonfly (Baen, 1985) paperback, 110,000 words
2. Return to Rocheworld (1993) with Julie Forward Fuller
3. Marooned on Eden (1993) with Martha Dodson Forward
4. Ocean Under the Ice (1994) with Martha Dodson Forward
5. Rescued from Paradise (1995) with Julie Forward Fuller

Novels
 Martian Rainbow (1991)
 Timemaster (1992)
 Camelot 30K (1993)
 Saturn Rukh (1997)

Collection (contains both fiction and essays)
 Indistinguishable from Magic (1995)

Non-fiction
 Mirror Matter: Pioneering Antimatter Physics (1988) with Joel Davis
 Future Magic (1988) This book discusses possible future applications of Skyhooks and orbital rings amongst other technologies, including a plan by Hughes Aircraft for a potential flying saucer.

Forward also wrote many articles in scientific journals and filed many patents, mainly while working for Hughes Aircraft.

See also
 Starwisp, an ultralightweight interstellar probe proposed by Forward in 1985
 "Left to Right", a short story by Isaac Asimov featuring Forward

Explanatory notes

References

 "A Program for Interstellar Exploration", by Robert L. Forward, Journal of the British Interplanetary Society, Volume 29, pp. 611–632, 1976.

Further reading

Archival resources
 Since 1987, Robert L. Forward's papers (60 linear feet) have been housed at the Special Collections & Archives, University of California, Riverside Libraries.

External links

Robert L. Forward Collection, The University of Alabama in Huntsville Archives and Special Collections
Bibliography at SciFan
Obituary prepared by Dr. Forward himself
Extracting electrical energy from the vacuum by cohesion of charged foliated conductors One of Forward's most well known papers discussing the Casimir effect and zero-point energy (hosted at the Calphysics website)

 

1932 births
2002 deaths
20th-century American novelists
American male novelists
20th-century American physicists
American science fiction writers
University of Maryland, College Park alumni
Place of birth missing
20th-century American male writers
People from Geneva, New York